Live! 2012 is the first live album released by pop group Steps. The album was recorded during the band's The Ultimate Tour, which was the band's first arena tour since their Gold Tour in 2001. The album was released in June 2012.

Track listing 
 "Here and Now / You'll Be Sorry" – 10:36
 "Deeper Shade of Blue" – 8:39
 "Dance Game / Better Best Forgotten / Love's Got a Hold on My Heart" – 12:45
 "5, 6, 7, 8" – 3:11
 "Summer of Love" – 6:51
 "Better the Devil You Know / Judas" – 6:19
 "Moves Like Jagger / S&M" – 4:28
 "One Night Only" – 3:59
 "Don't Stop Believing'" – 5:32
 "Heaven / Beautiful People / Lately" – 5:02
 "I Surrender" – 5:21
 "It's the Way You Make Me Feel" – 5:30
 "Heartbeat" – 5:57
 "When I Said Goodbye" – 4:15
 "One for Sorrow" – 4:35
 "Stomp" – 4:36
 "Chain Reaction" – 3:54
 "Dancing Queen" – 4:08
 "Tragedy" – 5:47

Release history

See also 
 The Ultimate Tour (Steps)

References 

2012 live albums
Steps (group) albums